Clivina pravei is a species of ground beetle in the subfamily Scaritinae. It was described by Lutshnik in 1927.

References

pravei
Beetles described in 1927